Hector is an English, French, Scottish, and Spanish given name. The name is derived from the name of Hektor, a legendary Trojan champion who was killed by the Greek Achilles. The name Hektor is probably derived from the Greek ékhein, meaning "to have", "to hold", "to check", "restrain". In Scotland, the name Hector is sometimes an anglicised form of the Scottish Gaelic Eachann, and the pet form Heckie is sometimes used. The name of Sir Ector, the foster father of King Arthur, is also a variant of the same.

Etymology
In Greek,  is a derivative of the verb ἔχειν ékhein, archaic form * ('to have' or 'to hold'), from Proto-Indo-European *seɡ́ʰ- ('to hold'). Hector's name could thus be taken to mean 'holding fast'.

Cognates
Irish: Eachtar
Italian: Ettore
Portuguese: Heitor
Greek: Modern Greek: Έκτορας (Ectoras), Ancient Greek: Ἕκτωρ (Hector)

People with the name 
 Hector Abhayavardhana (1919-2012), Sri Lankan Sinhala Trotskyist politician
 Hector Appuhamy, Member of the Sri Lanka Parliament for Puttalam District
 Hector Arawwawala, Governor of North Western Province, Sri Lanka from July 1994 - January 1995
 Héctor Ávila, Dominican boxer
 Héctor Ballesteros, Colombian weightlifter
 Héctor Bellerín, Spanish football (soccer) player
 Hector Boece, a Scottish philosopher and historian
 Hector Berlioz, French composer
 Hector (Toe) Blake, Canadian hall of fame hockey player and coach
 Hector Luis Bustamante, Colombian actor
 Héctor Carrasco, Dominican baseball player
 Héctor Castaño, Colombian road cyclist
 Hector Charlesworth, Canadian writer, editor and critic
 Hector Crawford, Australian radio and television producer
 Hector de Zayas, U.S. Marine Corps officer and Navy Cross recipient
 Hector Deheragoda, Solicitor General of Sri Lanka from 1970-1972
 Héctor del Curto, Argentine tango bandoneon player
 Héctor Delgado, reggaeton artist
 Héctor Elizondo, Puerto Rican-American actor
 Héctor Ferri, Ecuadorian football (soccer) player
 Hector Halsall, English rugby league footballer with Swinton RLFC in the 1920s
 Hector A. Hanson, American farmer and politician
 Hector Hetherington, Scottish philosopher
 Héctor King, Mexican recording artist
 Hector Kobbekaduwa, Sri Lankan Sinhala lawyer and politician
 Héctor Lavoe, Puerto Rican salsa singer
 Hector Lombard, Cuban-Australian mixed martial artist
 Hector Munro Macdonald, Scottish mathematician
 Hector Carsewell Macpherson, Scottish writer and journalist
 Héctor Moreno (footballer), Mexican football (soccer) player
 Hector Munro, 8th laird of Novar, a Scottish-born British soldier who became the ninth Commander-in-Chief, India 
 Hector Hugh Munro, British writer who used the pseudonym Saki
 Héctor Noguera, Chilean television, film and theatre actor
 Héctor Germán Oesterheld, Argentine journalist and writer of graphic novels and comics
 Hector Ó hEochagáin, Irish radio and television presenter
 Héctor Palacio, Colombian road racing cyclist
 Hector de Saint-Denys Garneau, Canadian poet
 Héctor Soto, Puerto Rican volleyball player 
 Héctor Thomas, Venezuelan decathlete
 Héctor Timerman, Argentine foreign minister
 Hector Tyndale, American military officer
 Héctor Velásquez, Chilean boxer
 Héctor Vidal Martínez, Paraguayan football (soccer) midfielder
 Héctor Vilches, Uruguayan football (soccer) player
 Héctor Yan (born 1999), Dominican Republic professional baseball player

Arthurian legend 
 Sir Ector 
 Hector de Maris

Fictional characters 
Monomial characters
 Hector, minor character in the book series A Series of Unfortunate Events
 Hector (Ambrosia Mascot), parrot, unofficial mascot of games company Ambrosia Software
 Hector (Castlevania), from Castlevania: Curse of Darkness
 Hector (Fire Emblem), from the Fire Emblem video game franchise
 Hector (Marvel Comics), a Marvel Comics superhero
 Hector: Fat Arse of the Law, in the adventure video game Hector: Badge of Carnage
 Hector, a polite robot of the father and son android pair Hector and Vector in "Greetings from Earth" (1979), an episode of the Battlestar Galactica (1978 TV series)
 Hector, the evil robot in the film Saturn 3
 Hector, a character in the film Coco
Monomial with descriptor
 Hector the Bulldog, in Looney Tunes cartoons
 Hector the Cat, a mascot for the teaching of road safety to children in Australia
 Hector the Dog, in the British children's television series Hector's House
Binomial characters
 Hector Alembick, character from King Ottokar's Sceptre
 Hector Barbossa, in the Pirates of the Caribbean film series
 Hector Bowen, aka Prospero the Enchanter, from the novel The Night Circus
 Hector Ruiz, from the American television series The Electric Company
 Hector Cruz, from the American animated television series Ozzy & Drix
 Hector "Hec" Faulkner, a character from the film Hunt for the Wilderpeople
 Hector Garcia, a character from Zits
 Hector Gonzales, in the film For Your Eyes Only
 Hector Hall, a DC Comics character
 Hector Hammond, a DC Comics supervillain.
 Hector "High Five" Nieves, one of the two main characters in the animated web television series Glitch Techs.
 Hector Ricardo, a minor character in the Lorien Legacies series
 Hector Salamanca, a character in Breaking Bad and Better Call Saul
 Hector Williams, one of the main characters in the American television show The Unit
 Hector "Zero" Zeroni, a character in the novel Holes and its film adaption
Polynomial characters
 Hector Con Carne, the main character from the American animated series Evil Con Carne

See also
Hector (disambiguation), other things named Hector on Wikipedia

• Orthodox Church celebrating Saint Hector

References

Masculine given names
Scottish masculine given names
English masculine given names
French masculine given names
Spanish masculine given names